The Punchbowl was the name given to the bowl-shaped Haean Basin in Yanggu County, Gangwon Province by UN Forces during the Korean War. The Punchbowl lies several km south of the Korean Demilitarized Zone.

History 
The Punchbowl was captured by the Korean People's Army (KPA) in the opening days of the Korean War. It was recaptured by UN forces in late September 1950 during the UN offensive that followed the Inchon landings and the breakout from the Pusan perimeter. UN Forces abandoned the region in mid-December 1950, during the withdrawal following the Chinese People's Volunteer Army intervention in the war.

On 4 June 1951 the 1st Marine Division and the ROK 5th Infantry Division began to advance north of Inje towards the Punchbowl and the Hwacheon Reservoir. By 10 June the Marine/ROKA force had secured Line Kansas northeast of the Hwacheon Reservoir and the southern line of hills overlooking the Punchbowl.

Following the breakdown of armistice negotiations in August 1951, the United Nations Command decided to launch a limited offensive in the late summer/early autumn to shorten and straighten sections of their lines, acquire better defensive terrain, and deny the enemy key vantage points from which they could observe and target UN positions. The Battle of Bloody Ridge took place west of the Punchbowl from August–September 1951 and this was followed by the Battle of Heartbreak Ridge northwest of the Punchbowl from September–October 1951, meanwhile the 1st Marine Division reinforced by the Korean Marine Corps Regiment captured the line of hills north of the Punchbowl in the Battle of the Punchbowl from 31 August-20 September 1951.

The Yanggu War Memorial Hall is located in Haean town.

The 4th Infiltration Tunnel and the Eulji Observatory are located in the hills north of Haean town.

References

External links
 Korean Tourism website for the Yanggu region of the DMZ

Basins of Asia
Valleys of South Korea
Korean War
Landforms of Gangwon Province, South Korea
Yanggu County, Gangwon
History of Gangwon Province, South Korea